HMAS Parramatta (F05/DE 46), named for the Parramatta River, was a  (a licence-built Type 12 frigate) of the Royal Australian Navy (RAN).

Construction
Parramatta was laid down by Cockatoo Island Dockyard at Sydney, New South Wales on 31 January 1957. She was launched on 31 January 1959 by Lady Dowling, wife of the First Naval Member and Chief of Naval Staff, and commissioned into the RAN on 14 July 1961.

Operational history
Parramatta escorted Royal Yacht Britannia during the visit of Queen Elizabeth II in 1963.

The ship served on patrol duties during the Indonesia-Malaysia Confrontation during the mid-1960s. Parramatta escorted the former aircraft carrier back to Fremantle: the return voyage to Australia was interrupted on the morning of 23 June by the detection of a suspected Indonesian submarine: the two Australian ships performed evasion tactics for eighteen hours before resuming the voyage. Other deployments were made during 1965 and 1966, with this service later recognised by the battle honour "Malaysia 1964–66".

During late May and early June 1965, Parramatta was one of several ships escorting Sydney on her first troop transport voyage to South Vietnam. Parramatta and Sydney worked together on the latter's tenth Vietnam voyage during March and April 1968. Parramattas third escort run with Sydney occurred in May 1971; the former carrier's twentieth Vietnam voyage.

On 17 July 1976, Parramatta was en route to Singapore when she was diverted to Bali in response to the 1976 Bali earthquake.

Parramatta underwent a modernisation refit at Williamstown Naval Dockyard between 3 June 1977 and 26 August 1981, and visited the People's Republic of China in 1986.

Decommissioning and fate
Parramatta' paid off on 11 January 1991. She was sold in August 1991, and broken up for scrap in Pakistan.

The ship's twin 4.5 inch Mark 6 gun turret, along with the captain's cabin from time of the ship's decommissioning, are preserved at the RAN Naval Heritage Collection Repository on Spectacle Island, Sydney.

Citations

References

 
 

River-class destroyer escorts
1959 ships